Sin City: Original Motion Picture Soundtrack is the soundtrack to the 2005 film Sin City. It features music composed by Robert Rodriguez, John Debney and Graeme Revell, performed by the Hollywood Studio Symphony, as well as the orchestral track "Sensemayá" from Mexican composer Silvestre Revueltas and the electronica piece "Absurd" by Fluke.

Composers' approach
Because the film is based on different comic book stories (written by Frank Miller), each composer was assigned to score a different story. Revell scored the music to The Hard Goodbye (Rodriguez co-scored for tracks four, six and eight); Debney scored The Big Fat Kill (Rodriguez co-scored tracks eleven and twelve); Rodriguez scored That Yellow Bastard as well as the opening credits sequence and the first track in the end credits.

Miscellaneous music
The song featured in the trailers and television spots was an instrumental version of the song "Cells" by The Servant and briefly appeared in the movie as a sample.

Track listing

Credits
 Executive Producer: Robert Townson
 Conducted by John Debney
 Score Recorded at Todd-AO Scoring, Studio City, CA
 Score Mixed at Media Ventures, Santa Monica, CA
 Score Recorded and Mixed by Alan Meyerson
 Additional Conducting: Bruce Babcock
 Electronic Score Engineer: Wolfgang Amadeus
 Music Score Coordinator: Lola Debney
 Performed by The Hollywood Studio Symphony
 Package Design by Matthew Joseph Peak / SoundChaser Studios
 Saxophone solo: Dan Higgins
 Trumpet solo: Dan Savant
 Tenor Sax (traks 1,2 & 4): Johnny Reno
 Upright Bass solos: Mike Valerio

Instrumentation

 Strings: 30 violins, 18 violas, 12 violoncellos, 8 double basses
 Brass: 4 horns, 3 trumpets, 3 trombones, tuba, alto & bass saxophones

Reviews
Jerry McCulley of Amazon.com says, "While their largely synth-driven cues tend naturally towards brooding atmospheric soundscapes, their tense electro-rhythms are seasoned with bracing doses of sinewy, sensual sax and dotted with the occasional bongo flourish, details that musically evoke both a shadowy humanity and the film's genre-savvy roots."

Mike Brennan of SoundtrackNet gives it four stars saying, "While each composer brings a different style and feel to the film, the rough saxophone and sorrowful trumpet and vocal solos maintain a soundscape that keeps the film one entity rather than three separate stories. Behind a groundbreaking visual piece is also a unique musical journey that truly takes the listener into the world of Sin City."

Christian Clemmensen of Filmtracks.com said, "Sin City is a decent score with an excellent rendering. No single element will blow you away (other than that final Debney cue), but its whole is surprisingly organic and pulpy."

References

External links
 

Crime film soundtracks
Soundtrack
2005 soundtrack albums
Robert Rodriguez soundtracks
John Debney soundtracks
Graeme Revell soundtracks